"Be Happy" is a song by American singer Mary J. Blige. It was written by Blige, Sean "Puffy" Combs, Arlene DeValle, and Jean-Claude Olivier from duo Poke & Tone for her second studio album, My Life (1994), while production was helmed by Combs and Olivier. "Be Happy" contains an instrumental sample of the song "You're So Good to Me" (1979) by musician Curtis Mayfield and a re-sung vocal portion of the record "I Want You" (1976) by Marvin Gaye.

The song was released as the lead single from the album and reached number 29 on the US Billboard Hot 100, while reaching number six on the Hot R&B/Hip-Hop Songs, becoming her fifth top-ten single on that particular chart, and number thirty on the UK Singles Chart. Upon its release, Blige performed the song on shows such as Friday Night Videos, The Tonight Show with Jay Leno, Soul Train, Teen Summit, Showtime at the Apollo among others.

Remixes
The official remix features Def Squad rapper Keith Murray, which samples 1980s hip hop artist Jimmy Spicer's "Money (Dollar Bill Ya'll)". Blige and Murray performed the remix version during Showtime at the Apollo'''s 200th episode that aired in early February 1996.

Critical reception
Larry Flick from Billboard described the song as "a jam that deftly combines classic soul flavors with a jeep-smart urban/hip-hop spice." He added, "Her already stylish delivery has a pleasing new maturity and a warmth that will only broaden her audience. Factor in a sing-along chorus and a sweet melody, and you have the recipe for a multiformat smash." Steve Baltin from Cash Box felt that "Be Happy" "is a little more R&B-oriented that her previous hits, making it a work that needs to grow on listeners rather than exploding with them. But once audiences catch up to Blige, they’re sure to be drawn in by her sultry vocals during the chorus and the strong repetitive groove found throughout. A worthy song to carry on her growing success." Chuck Campbell from Knoxville News Sentinel noted the "chugging '70s groove" of the track.

Pan-European magazine Music & Media commented, "The queen of swingbeat sings her life motto on a prominent bass pattern. For the chorus the melody gets a "What's Going On" twist with synth violins and all." Ralph Tee from Music Weeks RM Dance Update gave it four out of five, writing that here, "the queen of hip hop soul returns, this time utilising a massive great chunk of Curtis Mayfield's 1979 gem "You're So Good To Me" as her accompaniment. In fact she creates new lyrics and melodies over the original instrumental and cheekily includes the instrumental on the 12-inch as a self penned bonus track! However, while this isn't in the league of "Love No Limit" with its Keni Burke sample, it's already set to be huge with fans." Another editor, James Hamilton, declared it as "superb" and "slinky".

Music video
There were produced two official music videos for "Be Happy", both directed by Puff Daddy.

Track listings

 U.S. cassette single "Be Happy" (Radio edit) – 4:29
 "Be Happy" (Acapella version) – 4:34

 U.S. 12-inch single "Be Happy" (Album version) – 5:49
 "Be Happy" (Instrumental) – 5:49
 "Be Happy" (Acapella) – 4:34

 U.S. CD promo single – Version 1 "Be Happy" (Radio edit) – 4:29
 "Be Happy" (Album version) – 5:49
 "Be Happy" (Instrumental) – 5:49
 "Be Happy" (Acapella versoin) – 4:34

 U.S. CD promo single – Version 2 "Be Happy" (Bad Boy Butter mix – edit) – 4:24
 "Be Happy" (Ron G H. & R. Funk mix) – 3:42
 "Be Happy" (Bad Boy Butter mix) – 4:41
 "Be Happy" (Album version) – 5:49

 U.K. cassette single "Be Happy" (Radio edit) – 4:29
 "Be Happy" (Maurice's Muthafunkin' mix) – 4:42

 U.K. CD single – CD1 "Be Happy" (Radio edit) – 3:53
 "Be Happy" (Album version) – 5:49
 "Be Happy" (Maurice's Muthafunkin' mix) – 4:42
 "Be Happy" (Uno Clio mix) – 7:19
 "Be Happy" (Maurice's Be Happy House mix) – 7:32

 U.K. CD single – CD2 "Be Happy" (U.S. Radio edit) – 4:29
 "Be Happy" (Ron G H. & R. Funk mix) – 3:42
 "Be Happy" (Bad Boy Butter mix) – 4:41
 "Be Happy" (UBQ Dub Be Happy) – 6:16

 U.K. 12-inch single' "Be Happy" (Album version) – 5:49
 "Be Happy" (Uno Clio mix) – 7:19
 "Be Happy" (Maurice's Be Happy House mix) – 7:32
 "Be Happy" (UBQ Dub Be Happy) – 6:16
 "Be Happy" (Maurice's Muthafunkin' mix) – 4:42

Charts

Weekly charts

Year-end charts

Release history

Credits and personnel
Credits adapted from the My Life'' liner notes.

Mary J. Blige – lead vocals
LaTonya J. Blige - background vocals 
Nashiem Myrick – recording engineer 
Prince Charles Alexander – recording engineer, audio mixing 
Tony Maserati – audio mixing 
Chucky Thompson - additional instruments

References

1993 songs
Mary J. Blige songs
Songs written by Sean Combs
Songs written by Mary J. Blige
Song recordings produced by Teddy Riley
Music videos directed by Hype Williams
1994 singles
Uptown Records singles
Song recordings produced by Trackmasters
Songs written by Jean-Claude Olivier